Balls Creek (2004 pop.: 427) is a community in the Canadian province of Nova Scotia, located in the Cape Breton Regional Municipality on Cape Breton Island. It is located along a creek of the same name, both named after Ingram Ball who was given a grant bordering on the creek in 1795.

The first school in the community was built some time before 1875.  The present school, built as a public school in 1957, is now the home of Munro Academy, a private religious school established in 2009.

A Postal Way Office was established in 1850.  In 1956 the population was 342.

References

 Balls Creek on Destination Nova Scotia

Communities in the Cape Breton Regional Municipality